XP School is a coeducational secondary school and sixth form located in Doncaster, South Yorkshire, England. The school opened in August 2014.

It bases its practices on the High Tech High charter schools and expeditionary learning schools in the United States. XP students complete cross-subject expeditions.

There are 250 students in Key Stages 3 and 4 for each school, with an additional 200 students catered for Post 16. Each school caters for ages 11–19, with 25 students in each class and two classes per year group as of 2022.

In October 2016, it also become the new home of local community radio station Sine FM.

The school's most recent Ofsted inspection in 2017 rated it as "Outstanding".

References

Secondary schools in Doncaster
Free schools in Yorkshire
Educational institutions established in 2014
2014 establishments in England